The Malaysian Grand Prix (officially the Malaysia Grand Prix from 1963–1965 and 2011–2017 and Malayan Grand Prix in 1962) was an annual auto race held in Malaysia. It was part of the Formula One World Championship from 1999 to 2017 and it was held during these years at the Sepang International Circuit. The Malaysian Grand Prix was held annually from 1962 to 1964 in Singapore, whilst it was a member of the Malaysian federation. Subsequent Grands Prix were held in Peninsular Malaysia.

History

Singapore and Shah Alam 
From 1962 to 1965 an annual race weekend for motorcycles and Formula Libre cars was held at the Thomson Road circuit in Singapore, named the Malaysia Grand Prix. After Singapore gained independence from Malaysia in 1965 the event was renamed the Singapore Grand Prix and continued until 1973.

Between Singapore's departure from the Malaysian federation and the opening of Sepang Circuit, Malaysia hosted a range of other racing categories in the Malaysian Grand Prix at Shah Alam's own circuit between 1968 and 1995 including Formula Libre (1968), Tasman Formula, (1969-1972), Formula Atlantic (1973–1975), Formula Two (1977) Formula Pacific (1978–1982) and Formula Brabham (1995).

Sepang International Circuit 
As part of a series of major infrastructure projects in the 1990s under Mahathir Mohamad's government, the Sepang International Circuit was constructed between 1997 and 1999 close to Putrajaya, the then-newly founded administrative capital of the country, with the intent of hosting the Malaysian Grand Prix. Similar to other of the country's circuits, the circuit is known for its unpredictable humid tropical weather, varying from clear furnace hot days to tropical rain storms.

Ferrari dominated the race, with Schumacher handing the victory to title-hopeful teammate Eddie Irvine, only for both Ferraris to be disqualified due to a technical irregularity, before later being reinstated.

From 2001, the Malaysian Grand Prix moved from the end of the season to the beginning, which has seen some topsy-turvy results as teams and drivers got to grips with their new equipment, with many races heavily influenced by the winners and losers of the scramble for position into the tight double hairpin bend at the first corner.

The 2001 event was hit by a heavy rainstorm in the middle of the race which made conditions very difficult. Conditions were so bad that the two Ferraris of Michael Schumacher and Rubens Barrichello spun off almost simultaneously at the same corner. Remarkably, they both recovered to score a Ferrari 1–2, because for a long time they were nearly 5 seconds faster than anyone else on the field. Elsewhere, the race was even led by Jos Verstappen, surprisingly. However, as the track begun to dry, he fell back to seventh, but his efforts to keep positions were memorable.

On 8 April 2007, shortly before the 2007 Malaysian Grand Prix, Formula One president Bernie Ecclestone was quoted as stating that the circuit was getting "shabby" and "a bit tired" from the lack of care, describing it as "an old house that needs a bit of redecorating". He noted that the circuit itself is not the issue, but rather the surrounding environment; rubbish is said to be littered all over the place, potentially damaging the circuit's good reputation when it was opened in 1999.

The day before, Malaysian Prime Minister Abdullah Ahmad Badawi had met Ecclestone to discuss an extension of the Formula One contract beyond 2010. While the government had been given an additional extension to host the Grand Prix until 2015, the government was still mulling the offer, as of 23 April 2007. The circuit was given a renewed contract in 2006 to organise the Malaysian Grand Prix for another five years.

On 13 February 2008, the management of the Sepang International Circuit announced its aim to become Formula One's second night race from  after Singapore, following discussions about buying a floodlighting system. Mokhzani Mahathir, the chairman of the circuit, was quoted as saying that the lights "might be custom made for the circuit." However, the organisers ended up settling for a late-afternoon start time.

The 2009 Malaysian Grand Prix was held around sunset, starting at 17:00 local time (09:00 UTC). This proved disastrous due to heavy rainfall. The race was red-flagged and ultimately not restarted due to the low light level making it through the clouds. The race ended on lap 33, and with the regulations requiring 42 laps for full points, both driver and constructor results were halved in relation to points.

On 7 April 2017, it was announced that the 2017 race would be the swansong of the Malaysian Grand Prix. The race's contract was due to expire in 2018, but its future had been under threat due to rising hosting fees and declining ticket sales. Malaysia's youth and sports minister at the time Khairy Jamaluddin said on Twitter: "I think we should stop hosting the F1. At least for a while. Cost too high, returns limited. When we first hosted the F1 it was a big deal. First in Asia outside Japan. Now so many venues. No first mover advantage. Not a novelty." The BBC reported that "Malaysia had struggled in recent years to attract a significant crowd, its appeal having been damaged by the more glamorous night-time event on a street track in Singapore."

Winners of the Malaysian Grand Prix

Repeat winners (drivers)
A pink background indicates an event which was not part of the Formula One World Championship.

Drivers in bold are competing in the Formula One championship in the current season.

Repeat winners (constructors)
A pink background indicates an event which was not part of the Formula One World Championship.

Teams in bold are competing in the Formula One championship in the current season.

Repeat winners (engine manufacturers)
A pink background indicates an event which was not part of the Formula One World Championship.

Manufacturers in bold are competing in the Formula One championship in the current season.

* Built by Cosworth

** Built by Ilmor in 2003

*** Built by Renault

By year
A pink background indicates an event which was not part of the Formula One World Championship.

Support races
Formula BMW Asia and Porsche Carrera Cup Asia have supported the Malaysian Grand Prix since 2003.

References

External links 

 Sepang International Circuit official website
 Motorsport The Asian Way by Roderick Eime
 Malaysia statistics

 
Formula One Grands Prix
National Grands Prix
Recurring sporting events established in 1962
Recurring sporting events disestablished in 2017
1962 establishments in Malaya
2017 disestablishments in Malaysia